Jaroslav Holík (August 3, 1942 – April 17, 2015) was a Czech professional ice hockey coach and former player. Holík played in the Czechoslovak Extraliga for Dukla Jihlava. He won a bronze medal at the 1972 Winter Olympics in Sapporo. He was also successful at the Ice Hockey World Championships, winning gold at the 1972 World Ice Hockey Championships in Prague, silver at the 1965 World Ice Hockey Championships in Tampere and 1966 World Ice Hockey Championships in Ljubljana, and bronze at the 1969 World Ice Hockey Championships, 1970 World Ice Hockey Championships, both in Stockholm, and 1973 World Ice Hockey Championships in Moscow.

After he finished his playing career, Holík worked as a coach. In 2000 he led the Czech under-20 national team to the victory at the 2000 World Junior Ice Hockey Championships in Sweden. He died on April 17, 2015.

Holík's son is NHL player Bobby Holík, and Czechoslovak player Jiří Holík is his brother. Holík's grandson, David Musil, was drafted by the Edmonton Oilers.

References

External links

1942 births
2015 deaths
Czech ice hockey coaches
Czech ice hockey centres
Czechoslovak ice hockey coaches
Czechoslovak ice hockey centres
HC Dukla Jihlava players
Ice hockey players at the 1972 Winter Olympics
Medalists at the 1972 Winter Olympics
Olympic ice hockey players of Czechoslovakia
Olympic bronze medalists for Czechoslovakia
Olympic medalists in ice hockey
Sportspeople from Havlíčkův Brod